Richard Scott (born October 2, 1983) is a Canadian professional golfer.

Scott was born in Kingsville, Ontario. He learned golf as a youth at the Kingsville Golf Club, southeast of Windsor, Ontario, near Lake Erie. He won the Canadian Amateur Championship in 2003, 2005, and 2006. In 2005, he was a member of the NCAA championship team from the University of Georgia with Chris Kirk, Kevin Kisner, and Brendon Todd. He graduated, then turned professional in the fall of 2006, and has been playing on the Canadian Professional Golf Tour.

Team appearances
Amateur
Eisenhower Trophy (representing Canada): 2004, 2006

External links

Canadian male golfers
Georgia Bulldogs men's golfers
Golfing people from Ontario
People from Essex County, Ontario
1983 births
Living people